Bass River station was a railroad station located in Yarmouth, Massachusetts. 

South Yarmouth station was constructed in 1865 at Great Western Road. It was moved west to Station Road around the end of the century, and was later renamed Bass Rocks. The station was closed in 1936 and demolished the next year.

References

External links

Yarmouth, Massachusetts
Old Colony Railroad Stations on Cape Cod
Stations along Old Colony Railroad lines
Former railway stations in Massachusetts
1865 establishments in Massachusetts
1936 disestablishments in Massachusetts